Nadimi Ghasre Dashti (born 31 May 1940) is an Iranian boxer. He competed in the men's light welterweight event at the 1964 Summer Olympics. At the 1964 Summer Olympics, he defeated Gopalan Ramakrishnan of Malaysia, before losing to João da Silva of Brazil.

References

1940 births
Living people
Iranian male boxers
Olympic boxers of Iran
Boxers at the 1964 Summer Olympics
Place of birth missing (living people)
Light-welterweight boxers